Dorylinae is an ant subfamily, with distributions in both the Old World and New World. Brady et al. (2014) synonymized the previous dorylomorph subfamilies (Aenictinae, Aenictogitoninae, Cerapachyinae, Ecitoninae, and Leptanilloidinae) under Dorylinae., while Borowiec (2016) reviewed and revised the genera, resurrecting many genera which had previously been merged.

Genera

Acanthostichus Mayr, 1887
Aenictogiton Emery, 1901
Aenictus Shuckard, 1840
Cerapachys Smith, 1857
Cheliomyrmex Mayr, 1870
Chrysapace Crawley, 1924
Cylindromyrmex Mayr, 1870
Dorylus Fabricius, 1793
Eburopone Borowiec, 2016
Eciton Latreille, 1804
Eusphinctus Emery, 1893
Labidus Jurine, 1807
Leptanilloides Mann, 1923
Lioponera Mayr, 1879
Lividopone Bolton & Fisher, 2016
Neivamyrmex Borgmeier, 1940
Neocerapachys Borowiec, 2016
Nomamyrmex Borgmeier, 1936
Ooceraea Roger, 1862
Parasyscia Emery, 1882
†Procerapachys Wheeler, 1915
Simopone Forel, 1891
Sphinctomyrmex Mayr, 1866
Syscia Roger, 1861
Tanipone Bolton & Fisher, 2012
Vicinopone Bolton & Fisher, 2012
Yunodorylus Xu, 2000
Zasphinctus Wheeler, 1918

References

External links

 
Ant subfamilies